Grootdrink is a town in !Kheis Local Municipality in the Northern Cape province of South Africa on the N10 National Route and on the Orange River. The town is known as being the centre of wine production in the Northern Cape.

References

Populated places in the !Kheis Local Municipality